The women's individual épée competition at the 2010 Asian Games in Guangzhou was held on 20 November at the Guangda Gymnasium.

Schedule
All times are China Standard Time (UTC+08:00)

Results

Round of pools

Pool 1

Pool 2

Pool 3

Summary

Knockout round

Final standing

References
Women's Individual Epée Results

External links
Official website 

Women Épée